Manorama Singh  is an Indian politician. Her late husband Chandrashekhar Singh served as Chief Minister of Bihar. She was elected to the Lok Sabha from the Banka in Bihar as a member of the Indian National Congress in 1980s.

She was elected to Lok Sabha from Banka in 1984, but vacated the seat when her husband was made minister in Delhi in 1985. Her husband died in 1986, and one more bye-poll had to be held in 1986. She won 1986 Banka bye-election against George Fernandes of Janata Party with 186,237 votes against 156,853 votes. She lost election from Banka as Congress candidate in 1989, 1991, and 1996.

References

External links
Official biographical sketch in Parliament of India website

1938 births
Living people
Indian National Congress politicians from Bihar
India MPs 1984–1989
Lok Sabha members from Bihar
Women members of the Lok Sabha